Emirati nationality law governs citizenship eligibility in the United Arab Emirates (UAE). The law is primarily jus sanguinis. Foreigners may be naturalized and granted citizenship, but the process is limited due to the declining share of the Emirati population and fears of national identity loss. Gulf Cooperation Council citizens are allowed to live in the UAE without restriction and have the right of freedom of movement.

Authority
The Emirati nationality law is derived from the Federal Law No.17 of 1972 on Nationality and Passports, and is administered by the General Directorate of Residency and Foreigners Affairs (GDRFA) in each emirate.

Birth in the United Arab Emirates
In general, birth in the United Arab Emirates does not, in itself, confer Emirati citizenship as its law utilize jus sanguinis policy. Exceptions are made for foundlings.

Descent 
The following persons are automatically Emirati citizens by descent:

 Any Arab family settled in any of the member Emirates during or before year 1925, and who has maintained Emirati residence until the coming into force of enforcement of Federal Law No.17 of 1972.
 A person born in the UAE or abroad to an Emirati father.
 A person born in the UAE or abroad to an Emirati mother and whose affiliation to the father is not legally established.
 A person born in the UAE or abroad to an Emirati mother and of an unknown or stateless father.
 A person born in the UAE of unknown parents. Unless otherwise established, the foundling shall be deemed born in the UAE.

Children born to an Emirati father or an unknown or stateless father and an Emirati mother are Emirati citizens by descent, irrespective of the place of birth. Until 2017, children born to an Emirati mother and a foreign father could apply and receive Emirati citizenship once they reached age 18. Since October 2017 an Emirati mother can now confer Emirati nationality to her children once they reach six years of age.

Marriage 
A foreign woman married to an Emirati national may acquire citizenship provided that the marriage lasts for at least seven years with the condition of having at least one child, or ten years in the absence of children. The wife of a naturalized male citizen may also acquire Emirati citizenship.

Naturalization 
Naturalization is limited due to fears of loss of Emirati national identity and conservative culture, which are both considered under threat due to foreigners outnumbering native Emirati people eleven-to-one.

Nationality is granted to a foreigner if he or she fulfills the following conditions and is:

 An Arab with ancestral origins in Bahrain, Oman and Qatar who has been legally settled in the UAE for at least three years and has maintained a good reputation and has not been convicted of a crime.
 Arab individual who enjoys full legal capacity, has continuously and lawfully resided in the member emirates for at least seven years at the date of submitting a naturalisation application,  has lawful source of income, is of good reputation and good conduct, and not convicted of any offence involving moral turpitude or dishonesty. 
 Any person with Arabic proficiency who has been legally settled in the UAE since 1940 and has maintained a good reputation and has not been convicted of a crime. 
 Any person with Arabic proficiency who has been legally settled in the UAE for no less than 30 years with at least 20 years spent after the effective date of the 1972 law and has maintained a good reputation and has not been convicted of a crime.

The residency requirements for Emirati citizenship may be waived:
 by decree from the UAE President.
 to any person who renders honorable service to the UAE.

Any person who wishes to apply for naturalization has to be proficient in the Arabic language, has a legal source of income and has been in a continuous residence in the UAE, has an academic qualification, does not have a bad reputation, and has not been convicted of any crime. A person convicted for misdemeanor or dishonesty may apply on the condition of fulfilling recuperation or rehabilitation. A wife of an Emirati national does not need to have an academic qualification to be eligible for naturalization.

Nationality is granted after:
 a state security background check.
 a ceremony in which the person has sworn allegiance to the UAE.

The right to vote or the right to a nomination for parliament or governmental authority is limited to Emirati citizens by descent. Nationality is only granted once.

As per Human Rights Watch, many Emirati mothers have complained that the application process can be confusing and could take years for the authorities to respond. The amendments announced to UAE’s citizenship law in January 2021 are aimed to attract only the elite foreigners.

Dual citizenship 
Dual citizenship is permitted since 2021.

Loss of citizenship 
A citizen by descent may lose Emirati citizenship if:
 he or she engages in military service of a foreign state without authorization from the UAE government and despite been instructed to abandon the service.
 he or she acts for the interest of an enemy state.

A citizen by naturalization may additionally lose Emirati citizenship if:
 he or she commits or attempts to commit any act deemed dangerous against the state's security and safety.
 he or she is convicted repeatedly for disgraceful crimes.
 any forgery, fraud or adulteration is used in the acquisition of nationality.
 he or she resides outside the UAE without a valid reason for over four consecutive years.

Citizens are allowed to voluntarily give up Emirati citizenship.

Renouncing citizenship is viewed as a shame within the Emirati community, as citizenship is usually attributed to the Emirati community sense of national identity, it is particularly hard to attain, and it entitles the holder various benefits.

Permanent residency
In May 2019, the UAE Prime Minister Sheikh Mohammed bin Rashid Al Maktoum launched a permanent residency scheme, in an attempt to establish the UAE as the home to the large number of expatriates. Subject to additional criteria, investors and professionals in healthcare, engineering, science and art are eligible for permanent residency. The permanent residency scheme is expected to generate foreign investment, encourage entrepreneurship, and attract engineers, scientists and students of exceptional caliber.

See also
 Emirati passport
 Emirati diaspora
 Visa requirements for Emirati citizens

References 

Law of the United Arab Emirates
Immigration to the United Arab Emirates